Choriogonadotropin subunit beta is a protein that in humans is encoded by the CGB7 gene.

This gene is a member of the glycoprotein hormone beta chain family and encodes the beta 7 subunit of chorionic gonadotropin (CG). Glycoprotein hormones are heterodimers consisting of a common alpha subunit and a unique beta subunit which confers biological specificity. CG is produced by the trophoblastic cells of the placenta and stimulates the ovaries to synthesize the steroids that are essential for the maintenance of pregnancy. The beta subunit of CG is encoded by 6 genes which are arranged in tandem and inverted pairs on chromosome 19q13.3 and contiguous with the luteinizing hormone beta subunit gene.

References

External links

Further reading